The list of EuroLeague Women winning players shows all players who have won the EuroLeague Women,  the top-tier professional basketball club competition in Europe, formerly known as FIBA Women's European Champions Cup (1958-1996).

Winning players since 1959

See also 

 List of EuroLeague Women winning coaches

References

External links 
 Official website
 Official Facebook page
 EuroLeague history

EuroLeague Women
Euroleague